Ada Italia Pastore (b. 1906 – d. 1952) was an Argentine botanist, curator, teacher, and explorer. She had a doctorate in biological science and developed academic activities at the Darwinion Botanical Institute and CONICET. She was a student of Lorenzo R. Parodi and Arturo Eduardo Burkart.

Honors
 Member: Argentine Federation of University Women (FAMU)
 Member: Argentine Botanical Society
 Director: Bulletin of the Argentine Society of Horticulture

Bibliography

References

External links
 All genera and species described by Patores on the International Plant Names Index

1906 births
1952 deaths
Botanists with author abbreviations
20th-century Argentine botanists
Women botanists
Argentine curators
Argentine women curators
Argentine educators
Argentine women educators
Argentine explorers
20th-century Argentine women writers
20th-century Argentine writers
People from San Luis, Argentina